Ralph Ronald Musselman (born November 11, 1954) is a former Major League Baseball pitcher for the Seattle Mariners and Toronto Blue Jays (-).  Prior to turning professional, he played for the Clemson Tigers. Musselman was mostly a relief pitcher during his career, but did pick up four career victories. His lone MLB save came on September 24, 1984. Musselman pitched  of an inning, closing out a wild 9-8 Blue Jays victory over the Red Sox.

Following his baseball career, Musselman started a successful landscaping firm, Musselman Landscaping, which he dissolved in recent years to pursue a career as a realtor in the Wilmington, North Carolina area. Musselman is the biological father of professional golfer Lucas Glover.

References

External links

Ron Musselman at Baseball Gauge
Venezuelan Professional Baseball League

1954 births
Living people
Alexandria Dukes players
Alexandria Mariners players
American expatriate baseball players in Canada
Baseball players from North Carolina
Bellingham Mariners players
Cardenales de Lara players
Clemson Tigers baseball players
Leones del Caracas players
American expatriate baseball players in Venezuela
Louisburg Hurricanes baseball players
Lynn Sailors players
Major League Baseball pitchers
Oklahoma City 89ers players
Portland Beavers players
Rochester Red Wings players
Salt Lake City Gulls players
Seattle Mariners players
Spokane Indians players
Sportspeople from Wilmington, North Carolina
Syracuse Chiefs players
Tigres de Aragua players
Toronto Blue Jays players